Nerkattumseval ( also Nelkattanseval, called Nellitangaville by the British ) is traditionally recognized as one of the 72 palaiyams of Madura, already in existence in the days of Nagama Nayaka and his son Visvanatha Nayaka. It falls under the Sankarankovil taluk in Tenkasi District of Tamil Nadu.

Palayam location
This Maravar palaiyam was located in the Sankarankovil taluk, in the former Tirunelveli province of the Nayak kingdom of Madurai

Museum
Nerkattumseval has a museum for Puli Thevar erected by the Tamil Nadu Government.

Temples:
Shri Ullamudayar Sastha Temple, Sappani Muthu Temple, Amman temple, Sri vellapandian Temple, Karuppa Swami Temple, Mottaimalai Murugan Temple and Vinayagar Temple,swami ramapandian temple.

Nearby Palayams
 Kollamkondan
 Sivagiri
 Rajapalayam

References

Medieval India
Palayam